Vision Creation Newsun EP (sometimes written Vision△Creation△Newsun△ and often mislabeled as Sunsidal Cendencies) is the shortened version of the studio album of the same name by the Japanese experimental rock band Boredoms.

Track listing
"Sunsidal Cendencies" – 8:49 (remix of "◯")
"Moonsidal Cendencies (Moochy remix)" – 10:12
"11 Aug '99 Live (Total Eclipse + Grand Cross)/Uoredoms" – 24:31

Personnel
Yamantaka Eye – mixing, vocals, synthesizer, sampling, turntable
Yamamoto Seiichi – guitar
Hiyashi Hira – bass guitar, effects
Yoshimi P-We – drums, percussion, vocals, keyboard
ATR – drums, percussion, synthesizer
EDA - drums, percussion, synthesizer
Izumi Kiyoshi – synthesizer, sampling

1999 EPs
Boredoms EPs